The 13th Observation Escadrille was a unit of the Polish Air Force at the beginning of the Second World War. The unit was attached to the SGO Narew.



Air crew
Commanding officer: kpt. obs. Lucjan Fijuth

Equipment
7 RWD-14b Czapla and 2 RWD-8 airplanes.

See also
Polish Air Force order of battle in 1939

References
 

Polish Air Force escadrilles